"Miri" is the eighth episode of the first season of the American science fiction television series Star Trek. Written by Adrian Spies and directed by Vincent McEveety, it first aired on October 27, 1966.

In the episode, the Enterprise discovers an exact duplicate of Earth, where the only survivors of a deadly man-made plague are some of the planet's children.

Plot
The USS Enterprise answers a distress call. Using the ships instruments Spock measures the planet and determines its dimensions.  It has a circumference of 24,874 miles.

A landing party of Captain Kirk, First Officer Spock, Chief Medical Officer Dr. McCoy, Yeoman Janice Rand and two security personnel find it resembles an abandoned, 1960s-style Earth. They are attacked by a disfigured man, who has a seizure and dies after Kirk hits, while trying to fend him off. Noises draw the landing party to an abandoned building. They discover a teenage girl called Miri, who ran away from them because "grups" ("grownups") killed and maimed the children on the planet before dying out. She and her friends are "onlies", the only ones left. The distress call is traced to an automated signal.

The landing party, except for Spock, notice purple lesions on their bodies; Miri tells them that these are the first signs of the disease that has infected the planet and they will soon become like the other adults. The party find a medical research laboratory and look through documents for clues to the disease, discovering that it is a side effect of a life-extension experiment, affecting those who have reached puberty; death follows a brief period of violent madness. The "children" are actually over 300 years old, aging one month every century, but show the mental and emotional maturity of their biological age, rather than their actual age. When the disease begins, its victims have seven days to live. Although Spock is apparently immune, he considers himself a carrier who could infect the Enterprise if he returns.

Kirk uses his charm on Miri to persuade her to show him to the other children. However, mistrustful of the "grups", they disperse when Kirk and Miri approach their hideout. Jahn, an older boy and the leader of the children, steals the landing party's communicators, rendering McCoy's search for a cure impossible without the Enterprise computers. When Yeoman Rand panics at their impending fate and Kirk comforts her, a jealous Miri runs away and schemes with her friends to kidnap Rand.

McCoy discovers a possible vaccine for the disease, but without the ability to check the dosage with the ship's computers, the vaccine may kill the patient. Kirk tells Miri that they will all contract the disease if they don't help him find a cure. Upon realizing that she herself is infected, Miri brings Kirk to where Rand is being held. At Jahn's urging, the children swarm and gang up on Kirk. An injured and bleeding Kirk then angrily begs the children to think of the youngest amongst them, who will be helpless when the older ones are dead. He points out that their food supplies are running out; the children will starve within six months. Convinced, Jahn gives the communicators back to Kirk. He rounds up the children and returns to the laboratory, but in desperation McCoy has already injected himself with a dose of the vaccine. The doctor's sores fade, confirming the cure's effectiveness.

Back on the Enterprise, after vaccinating everyone and leaving the children in the care of a medical team, Kirk sends for teachers and advisers to help the children improve their lives.

Reception
Zack Handlen of The A.V. Club gave the episode an A− rating, describing using children as the antagonists as one of the script's "smarter twists". Handlen felt that the sense of threat was maintained throughout as although the audience knew the crew wouldn't die, "they don't know that."

BBC ban
Following the first screening of "Miri" on British television in December 1970, the BBC received a number of complaints regarding the episode's content. The quantity and nature of the complaints were never made public.

Throughout the 1970s and 1980s the BBC chose not to include the episode in repeat runs of Star Trek. Three other episodes from the series were also excluded: "Plato's Stepchildren", "The Empath", and "Whom Gods Destroy".

Fans writing to the BBC to complain about the ban during the show's repeat run in the mid-1980s, its fifth showing altogether, received a standard reply: "There are no plans to screen the four episodes because we feel that they deal most unpleasantly with the already unpleasant subjects of madness, torture, sadism and disease. You will appreciate that account must be taken that out of Star Trek's large and enthusiastic following, many are juveniles who would watch the programme no matter what time of day the series is put into the programme schedules." However, the ban was finally lifted for the BBC's next showing of the series in the early 1990s.  In 2020 it was also shown in Britain on the Horror Channel.

Production
The planetary exteriors were shot on the set used for fellow Desilu series The Andy Griffith Show, part of what had originally been known as the RKO Forty Acres backlot in Culver City which had been acquired by Desilu.

Apart from guest stars Kim Darby and Michael J. Pollard, several of the children on Miri's world were portrayed by relatives of the Trek cast and crew. Among them were William Shatner's daughters Lisabeth and Melanie, Grace Lee Whitney's son Scott, Vincent McEveety's son Steven, and Gene Roddenberry's daughters, Darleen and Dawn. Two others,
Phil and Iona Morris, children of Mission Impossible actor Greg Morris, later appeared in subsequent Star Trek shows as well.

This was child actress Kellie Flanagan's first television role. She played the Blonde Girl standing on the table in the schoolhouse. Between takes her agent, Dorothy Day Otis, got her a line to deliver during the scene, which led to Flanagan receiving her SAG card.

Another of the actors playing the children, John Megna, had played Charles Baker "Dill" Harris in To Kill a Mockingbird in 1962.

"Miri" was the first episode to feature regular background cast member David L. Ross as Lieutenant Galloway, one of the few core group of extras that had speaking lines throughout the series.

Tie-in novel sequel
The novel The Cry of the Onlies by Judy Klass takes place after the events of the episode. All references to Miri's world being a copy of Earth were ordered removed; Miri's world is presented as a long-abandoned colony of Earth. (In the original episode, no explanation is offered as to the reason the geography of planet looks exactly like that of Earth.)

References

External links

 "Miri"—Full episode for viewing at CBS.com
 

 
 "Miri" Review of the remastered version at TrekMovie.com

1966 American television episodes
Star Trek: The Original Series (season 1) episodes
Television episodes directed by Vincent McEveety
Television episodes pulled from general rotation
Works about children